This is a list of notable mosques in India. India has more than 300,000 active mosques a number which is more than most Islamic nations. Population wise India has the third largest Muslim population.

See also 
 Islam in India
 Lists of mosques
 List of grand mosques
 List of largest mosques
 List of oldest mosques
 List of tallest mosques
 List of Shia mosques in NCR
 Mosques in Kolkata

References 

Mosques in India
India
Mosques